This list of tallest buildings in Darwin ranks buildings in the city of Darwin, Australia by height to the highest architectural detail. This ranking system, created by the US-based Council on Tall Buildings and Urban Habitat includes the height to a spire but not to an antenna. It also stands as the tallest building in Northern Territory.

Tallest buildings

Projects
This is a list of the tallest buildings under construction, approved or proposed.

See also 

 List of tallest buildings in Australia
 List of tallest buildings in Oceania

References 



 
Darwin
Darwin, Northern Territory-related lists
Lists of buildings and structures in the Northern Territory